Ashes is the first extended play (EP) from Mia Fieldes. Essential Worship alongside Provident Label Group released the EP on 8 May 2015.

Critical reception

Awarding the EP four and a half stars from Worship Leader, Brendan Prout states, "the songs are sure to bring many to an honest and powerful encounter with the presence of the living God." Joshua Andre, giving the EP four and a half stars at 365 Days of Inspiring Media, writes, "an inviting and enjoyable EP". Rating the EP a 3.8 out of five for Christian Music Review, Laura Chambers describes, "As a lover of expressive writing, I can see Mia Fieldes’ gratitude for grace shining through in this pleasant set of songs, reminding us of His promises and provisions in this season of new life."

Awards and accolades
This album was No. 19, on the Worship Leader's Top 20 Albums of 2015 list.

Track listing

References

2015 EPs
Essential Records (Christian) albums